Haseena Atom Bomb is a 1990 cult Pakistani film directed by Saeed Ali Khan.  Originally recorded in Pashto on a low-budget, the film was subsequently dubbed in Urdu, becoming a national blockbuster.

References

External links 
 

Pakistani action films
Pashto-language films